The Sedona-Oak Creek Unified School District serves Sedona, Oak Creek, and Red Rock, Arizona. It operates Sedona Red Rock High School as well as the West Sedona School, which serves students in grades K through 8.  It previously operated the K–8 school Big Park Community; however, the school district voted in May 2020 to close the school due to budget deficit concerns.

Lawsuit 
Oskowis v. Sedona – Oak Creek Unified Sch. Dist., 65 IDELR 169 (D. Ariz. 2015)

Mr. Oskowis had filed four Due Process Complaints, which were consolidated into one hearing and decision. One of the problems was that the district failed to advance to subsequent short-term objectives, after the student met the prerequisite objectives. The Hearing Office found a denial of FAPE with respect to 4 IEP goals, ordered 90 hours of compensatory education, and rejected all other claims. As the Hearing Office noted, the district did not begin working with the student on his second short-term objectives related to color matching, photo matching, shape matching until November 2012, despite the fact the student had mastered the first short term objectives for all three of these goals in September 2012.

Mr. Oskowis was able to convince the Court to question the authenticity of documentation in a child's special education record. Senior U.S. District Judge James A. Teilborg observed that the prior written notice in the administrative record "differ[ed] substantially in content" from the version the parent claimed to have received by email. He rejected the parent's claim that the discrepancy demonstrated a need to validate all information in the administrative record. However, the judge agreed that the notices required further review. "The Court cannot ignore [the parent's] allegations because if correct, an erroneous administrative record would be a valid basis for the Court to admit additional evidence," Judge Teilborg wrote.

References

External links
 District website

School districts in Yavapai County, Arizona
Sedona, Arizona